Prince George Airport  (abbreviated in initials as PGA) is an airport that serves Prince George, British Columbia, Canada, and the surrounding area.

In 2019, 496,714 passengers used Prince George Airport. The airport offers multiple flights every business day between Prince George and Vancouver serviced by Air Canada via its Air Canada Express affiliate, WestJet and its affiliate WestJet Encore, and Central Mountain Air (CMA). CMA and Northern Thunderbird Air also have scheduled and charter services to many points in northern and central British Columbia as well as Edmonton, Alberta. WestJet flies a weekly non-stop flight to Puerto Vallarta, Mexico from November through to April. In January 2015, Pacific Coastal Airlines set up shop at Prince George offering two non-stop flights a day to Victoria, BC.  Air Canada Express and WestJet Encore both operate Bombardier Q400 turboprop into the airport while WestJet operates Boeing 737 jet liners.

In February 2015, Prince George hosted the 2015 Canada Winter Games. Approximately 15,000 people came to the city by air for the games.

The airport is classified as an airport of entry by Nav Canada and is staffed by the Canada Border Services Agency (CBSA). The airport can handle aircraft with up to 30 passengers or 120 if they are unloaded in stages.

History
The airport opened in 1920, and until 1932, the site was the bypass highway that ran from Tenth Avenue to Eighteenth Avenue. The airport served as a stopover for aircraft including United States Army Junkers JL-4's and de Havilland Fours going to Alaska. In 1932, the airport was moved to the intersections of Highway 97 and Highway 16, near Carney Hill (the same site is now the Prince George Golf and Curling Club). At this second, newer airport, US planes also flew in large numbers to Alaska prior to the United States declaring war on Japan. Planes seen included Douglas B-18's and Martin B-10's. This airport was used until about 1942 and was closed for good on March 31, 1944. During the 1930s and early 1940s, it contained Pineview Elementary School, which was renamed the Airport School.

The aerodrome was listed with two runways as follows:

 
On November 14, 1940, the Canadian-American Permanent Joint Board of Defence set out a need for a number of new northwest airports, including Prince George, for the support of a new Northwest Staging Route. This new staging route would provide protection, permit aircraft to be deployed rapidly to northwestern Canada and Alaska in time of emergency and allow men and supplies to be moved into the region by air. This location is now the site of today's airport. The Department of Transport built single family homes, an unmarried staff residence, a diesel electric power plant and vehicle maintenance garage. A small administration building and radio range station was built by Pan American World Airways (Pan Am) and a few years later (1944) this was replaced by a new, larger DOT administration/radio range terminal and a large hangar was built (it burned down in 2009) about the same time. The resident DOT staff were housed on the airport and the Pan Am staff were accommodated in houses built on the east side of the old Cariboo highway, across from the airport. In 1942, the United States Army Air Forces (USAAF) started construction of a number of buildings for their people and for Royal Canadian Air Force (RCAF) staff. The buildings included troop dormitories, a medical clinic, a gymnasium and a cafeteria. The latter was also used for USO shows and movies for airport staff. The US staff component included an Army Airways Communication Station, an Eleventh Air Force detachment (1452nd AAF Base Unit - detached from Edmonton Municipal) and a small detachment of United States Navy staff. The US Navy had a contract with Pan Am to fly men, equipment and everything else from Seattle to Juneau and Fairbanks via Prince George and on to Kodiak (Naval Air Station Kodiak), Dutch Harbor (Dutch Harbor Naval Operating Base), Adak (Naval Air Facility Adak)and back in periods when coastal weather conditions were poor. The Eleventh Air Force's 1452nd Base Unit at Prince George airport were Air Transport Command, charged with facilitating aircraft and supply shipments from the contiguous United States to Alaska on the Northwest Staging Route.

The new airport comprised , was completed on August 9, 1945, and had three runways arranged in a triangle. 
In 1941, after the completion of runway 14/32 (now 15/33), US-based Pan Am operated from the Prince George Airport as a stopover location on its Seattle to Fairbanks route ferrying men and equipment for the US Navy. In 1942, Canadian Pacific Air Lines (CP Air) began offering scheduled flights six times a week into Prince George. Canadian Pacific and its successor Canadian Airlines International served the airport for many years. During 1942, 1943, and 1944, the airport was used as an alternate airport (to Edmonton Municipal) by the United States Army Air Forces (USAAF) for United States to the Soviet Union Lend-Lease aircraft flown primarily from Great Falls, Montana to Alaska and on to the Soviet Union. Planes seen in the new Prince George airport were mostly P-39 Airacobras, P-63 Kingcobras, B-25 Mitchell bombers, and C-47 Skytrain  transports. Also seen were RCAF Hawker Hurricanes and Bristol Fairchild Bolingbroke bombers.

The aerodrome was listed as "Under construction - Field Serviceable" with three runways as follows:

During the war years, the RCAF ran the airport with close assistance from the Department of Transport and the USAAF. In 1946, with the war over, the airport was turned over to the Department of Transport by the RCAF and the USAAF and RCAF buildings were torn down, leaving the DOT buildings and homes as well as the Pan Am housing. These lasted until the early 1950s when they were either moved or torn down. The hangar was used until 2009 and the DOT Admin building - terminal was replaced with a new, modern terminal in 1973.

In the mid-1940s, the Airport School was re-established at Prince George Airport and served resident Department of Transportation children and children from neighbouring farms until the early 1950s. The school had up to three teachers and up to twenty-five students in grades one to six, at various times.

Over the years, Canadian Pacific operated such twin engine propeller aircraft as the Lockheed Lodestar, the Douglas DC-3, the Convair 240, and the larger, four engine Douglas DC-6B propliner and Bristol Britannia turboprop. In 1953, the first lights were installed along runway 14/32 (now 15/33). Later that same year, a United States Air Force B-29 Superfortress was forced to make an emergency landing along the same runway.

Prince George Airport was commercialized in 1963 when Mrs. P. Richardson opened the first coffee shop in the terminal. Wildlife such as moose or deer can be seen occasionally from the runway. During the WW2 years, wildlife near the airport was largely wiped out due to airport soldiers hunting in their free time.

CP Air operated jet service into the airport during the 1970s primarily with the Boeing 737-200 jet liner with non-stop flights to Vancouver, Fort St. John and Whitehorse as well as direct, no change of plane service to Edmonton, Grande Prairie, Fort Nelson and Watson Lake.  CP Air also operated non-stop Boeing 727-100 jet service to Vancouver as well as direct to Edmonton via a stop in Grande Prairie during the mid 1970s. Pacific Western Airlines also served Prince George at this time with Boeing 737-200 jet service to Vancouver, Edmonton, Kamloops and Dawson Creek, and de Havilland Canada DHC-6 Twin Otter turboprop and Douglas DC-3 flights to Kelowna, Penticton, Prince Rupert, Smithers, Terrace, Quesnel and Williams Lake. CP Air and Pacific Western would continue to compete with non-stop service to Vancouver into the 1980s with both airlines flying Boeing 737-200 on the route.  Pacific Western acquired CP Air and the combined airlines then operated as Canadian Airlines International.

Prince George Airport underwent a significant expansion and revitalization from 2003 to 2005 that included the development of more check-in counters, larger pre-board screening and holding areas, new baggage carousels, and a border control facility for processing international flights.

On November 17, 2009, the first Boeing 747 aircraft touched down at Prince George Airport, as part of a refuelling stop. It was a Southern Air cargo flight, en route from Caracas, Venezuela to Shanghai, China.
On December 19, 2009, a fire destroyed the Northern Thunderbird Air terminal with no loss of life The airline has stated that operations would continue as normal despite the setback.

On July 13, 2012, the third-largest operating cargo aircraft landed at Prince George Airport to pick up cargo. The Antonov-124 touched down safely to pick up 7 helicopters from VIH Helicopters en route to Luanda, Angola. The aircraft also fuelled up at Prince George while onsite. The Antonov returned to Prince George three months later with the helicopters.

In 2015, the Prince George Airport Authority constructed and opened up a  cargo warehouse. Rosenau Trucking Ltd. is currently the anchor tenant operating out of the facility.

Airlines and destinations

Cargo

See also
Prince George (North Cariboo Air Park) Airport

References

Notes
 The Forgotten War, Volume 1, Stan Cohen, publ April 1990, pg 10
 The Forgotten War, Volume 2, Stan Cohen, Publ March 2002, pg 121
 History of Canadian Airports, T.M. McGrath, Publ April 1984 by Transport Canada, pgs 175-177
 Army Air force units in Alaska (11th Air Force)
 World War II Aviation in Prince George, BC, College of New Caledonia Oral history Series, Pan_Am and All That, compiled by J. Kent Sedgwick, Publ 2008  
 US Army in World War II, Military Relations Between US & Canada, Stanley W. Deviaban, Chapter VIII, Activities in Western Canada, pgs 200-203.

External links

Prince George Airport
Guardian Aerospace; Flight School/ Air Charters
FlightSource Aviation Photo Database

National Airports System
Certified airports in British Columbia
Transport in Prince George, British Columbia
Royal Canadian Air Force stations
Military airbases in British Columbia
Military history of British Columbia